Mohammad Adeel Khalid Raja (born 15 August 1980), or Adeel Raja, is a Pakistan-born Dutch cricketer. He is a right-handed batsman and a right-arm offbreak bowler.

References

 
 

1980 births
Living people
Dutch cricketers
Netherlands One Day International cricketers
Pakistani cricketers
Cricketers at the 2003 Cricket World Cup
Cricketers at the 2007 Cricket World Cup
Cricketers at the 2011 Cricket World Cup
Pakistani emigrants to the Netherlands
Dutch people of Punjabi descent
Cricketers from Lahore
Sportspeople of Pakistani descent